International Schools Group (ISG), formerly Saudi Arabian International Schools (SAIS), operates five individual schools in the Saudi Arabia: American School Dhahran (ASD), British School Dhahran (BSD), ISG Dammam, ISG Jubail and Sara Village School (SVS). Two schools offer the National Curriculum for England (British School Dhahran and Sara Village School), while the others offer an American curriculum.

History
ISG is a not-for-profit school district founded in 1962 with six students on what was then called the Consular Academy. Schools are categorized into two divisions: American and British. Two schools offer the National Curriculum of England and Wales (British School Dhahran and Sara Village School), while the others offer an American curriculum. All ISG schools are accredited by the Middle States Association of Colleges and Schools (MSA) through December 2024.

New Campus
ISG's Dhahran campus shifted to the new campus in August 2022.

The new site is in the up-and-coming area of Aziziyah and has been developed by the Al Rashed Group. Located adjacent to the Canary Vista Compound off Khalediyah Road, it is within close proximity to Dhahran and Khobar.

The District is governed by a 12-member Board of Trustees and is licensed by the Saudi Arabian Ministry of Education.

References 

International Schools Group
American School Dhahran
British School Dhahran
ISG Dammam
ISG Jubail
Sara Village School

Private schools in Saudi Arabia
International schools in Saudi Arabia
American international schools in Saudi Arabia
Schools in Saudi Arabia
Education in Saudi Arabia